The Loreto Shrine Chapel is located in St. Nazianz, Wisconsin. It was added to the National Register of Historic Places in 1982.

History
The chapel was created by Ambrose Oschwald, the Roman Catholic priest who founded St. Nazianz. After a storm in 2000 damaged the chapel, it was restored by the St. Nazianz Historical Society.

References

Churches on the National Register of Historic Places in Wisconsin
Roman Catholic chapels in the United States
Buildings and structures in Manitowoc County, Wisconsin
National Register of Historic Places in Manitowoc County, Wisconsin